Pedro Miguel Vidal Campos (born 21 June 1995, in Guimarães) is a Portuguese footballer who plays for Vitória de Guimarães B, as a defender.

Football career
On 25 January 2015, Campos made his professional debut with Vitória Guimarães B in a 2014–15 Segunda Liga match against Feirense.

References

External links

Stats and profile at LPFP 

1995 births
Living people
Sportspeople from Guimarães
Portuguese footballers
Association football defenders
Liga Portugal 2 players
Vitória S.C. B players